Evelio Planas del Río (born 20 January 1930) is a Cuban former sprinter. He competed in the men's 400 metres, 800 metres and 4 × 100metres relay at the 1952 Summer Olympics. The relay team reached the semifinals.

References

External links
 

1930 births
Possibly living people
Athletes (track and field) at the 1952 Summer Olympics
Athletes (track and field) at the 1955 Pan American Games
Cuban male sprinters
Cuban male middle-distance runners
Olympic athletes of Cuba
Central American and Caribbean Games medalists in athletics
Central American and Caribbean Games silver medalists for Cuba
Central American and Caribbean Games bronze medalists for Cuba
Competitors at the 1950 Central American and Caribbean Games
Competitors at the 1954 Central American and Caribbean Games
Pan American Games competitors for Cuba
20th-century Cuban people